Highgate is a ward in the London Borough of Haringey, in the United Kingdom.

Councillors

Elections

Elections in the 2010s

References

Wards of the London Borough of Haringey